Édison Xavier Moreno Cruz (born 15 November 1979) is an Ecuadorian racewalker who competed in the 2004 Summer Olympics, 2008 Summer Olympics and 2012 Summer Olympics.

Personal best

Achievements

References

External links

1979 births
Living people
Ecuadorian male racewalkers
Olympic athletes of Ecuador
Athletes (track and field) at the 2004 Summer Olympics
Athletes (track and field) at the 2008 Summer Olympics
Athletes (track and field) at the 2012 Summer Olympics
World Athletics Championships athletes for Ecuador
Athletes (track and field) at the 2007 Pan American Games
Pan American Games gold medalists for Ecuador
Pan American Games medalists in athletics (track and field)
Medalists at the 2007 Pan American Games